Ohvrilaev is a novel by Estonian author Gert Helbemäe. It was first published in 1960 in Lund, Sweden by Eesti Kirjanike Kooperatiiv (Estonian Writers' Cooperative). In Estonia it was published in 1992.

Plot
The novel tells a love story between a middle-aged schoolteacher and a young Jewish girl taking place in the 1930s in Kalamaja.

Estonian novels
1960 novels
Novels set in the 1930s
Novels set in Estonia
Jews and Judaism in fiction